Alison E. Roman (born September 1, 1985) is an American food writer, chef and internet personality. She is best known for her viral recipes, such as #TheStew and #TheCookies, which were widely shared on social media platforms. Roman has held senior positions at Bon Appétit and Buzzfeed Food, and served as a columnist for New York Times Cooking. She was set to produce a new cooking program for CNN+ in 2022. After shutdown of CNN+, the show was moved to CNN as (More Than) A Cooking Show. Roman is the author of several cookbooks, including the New York Times Bestseller Nothing Fancy (2019).

Early life and education 
Roman was born September 1, 1985 to parents in their 30s and raised in Los Angeles, California in the San Fernando Valley area.

She withdrew from the University of California, Santa Cruz at the age of 19, where she was studying creative writing, to pursue a career in the food industry, eventually working as a chef at Sona in Los Angeles, Quince in San Francisco, Milk Bar in New York City and Pies ‘n’ Thighs in Brooklyn.

Career

Bon Appétit and early career (2011–2018) 
Roman began as a freelance recipe-tester at Bon Appétit in 2011 soon after the magazine had come under the leadership of editor-in-chief Adam Rapoport. She quickly gained a full-time position at the magazine and eventually became a senior food editor. Roman appeared prominently in the magazine's videos, articles and social media content.

Roman left Bon Appétit in 2015 for a senior role at Buzzfeed Food. 
Her first cookbook, Dining In, was published by Penguin Random House in 2017.

The New York Times, viral recipes and controversy (2018–2020) 
In early 2018, a cookie recipe Roman developed for Dining In (2017) went viral on Instagram, and became so well-known on the mobile app as to be known simply as #TheCookies. Months later she joined New York Times Cooking as a regular columnist.

Her second cookbook, Nothing Fancy (2019), enjoyed commercial and critical success when it was published the following year. The cookbook stresses the value of "unfussy" ingredients and the importance of authenticity when hosting friends and guests. Several of the recipes she developed for the book and The New York Times went viral, including the #TheStew.

Her recipes and online presence gained significant attention during the COVID-19 pandemic when home cooking increased. Her shallot pasta recipe (commonly known as #ThePasta), was particularly popular amidst the food shortages and constraints of the pandemic due to its use of everyday, pantry ingredients. New York Times Cooking later deemed it the most popular recipe of 2020.

In May 2020, Roman was criticized on social media for an interview in which she made critical remarks about the product lines of Chrissy Teigen and Marie Kondo, both of whom are of Asian descent: Critics claimed these remarks had racial undertones and pointed to her past practice of using Asian flavors in her recipes without acknowledging the sources of these flavors. 

After fighting with Teigen on Twitter then locking her own account, Roman apologized, saying that her white privilege had played a role in her making these remarks, as well as influencing her initial reaction when criticized on social media. During this time, Roman's New York Times column was put on temporary leave, with the intention to be reintroduced at some point in the future.

Departure and continued career (2020–present) 
In December 2020, Roman announced she would be leaving The New York Times to begin a "new chapter" elsewhere. A representative from the paper stated that "Alison decided to move on from The [New York] Times and we’re very thankful for her work with us."

Roman continues to share recipes through social media and a Substack newsletter. She began a new series of YouTube videos in January 2021 titled Home Movies.

Personal life 
Roman has lived in Brooklyn, New York since at least 2018. She describes herself as "half-Jewish" and regularly celebrates Passover and other religious holidays since moving to New York.

Bibliography
 Lemons. Short Stack Books, 2015. 
Dining In. Clarkson Potter/Publishers, 2017. 
With Fabián von Hauske and Jeremiah Stone, A Very Serious Cookbook: Contra Wildair. Phaidon Press, 2018. 
 Nothing Fancy. Clarkson Potter Publishers, 2019.

References

External links
 

 
Alison Roman's columns in the New York Times
Alison Roman on Substack
 
 Alison Roman on YouTube

1985 births
Living people
American cookbook writers
Writers from Los Angeles
Bon Appétit people
Women cookbook writers
The New York Times columnists
American women columnists
21st-century American women writers
21st-century American non-fiction writers
American women non-fiction writers